The bar-tailed cuckoo-dove (Macropygia nigrirostris) is a species of bird in the family Columbidae. It is native to New Guinea and the Bismarck Archipelago. It is rated as a species of least concern on the International Union for Conservation of Nature Red List of Endangered Species.

Description 
The bar-tailed cuckoo-dove measures  in length. It has a short, completely black bill. The six central tail feathers are black barred. The central breast feathers are not bifurcated. The male is ruddy-brown, with no clear distinction between the underparts and the upperparts. The female, however, has black barred upperparts. The juvenile is similar to the female, but its tail is barred irregularly.

It is differentiated from other sympatric (other species existing in the same geographic area and thus frequently encountering with it) pigeons other than cuckoo-doves, by its chestnut brown plumage and slender, long tail.

Distribution and habitat 
It is native to Papua New Guinea and Indonesia. It inhabits old-growth forests, forest peripheries, and second-growth forests.

Status and conservation 
Since 1988, the bar-tailed cuckoo-dove has been rated as a species of least concern on the IUCN Red List of Endangered Species. This is because it has a very large range—more than 20,000 km2 (7,700 mi2)—and because it has a stable population trend. Also, although its population numbers has not been determined, it is commonly found throughout most of its distribution, it is thought to be above 10,000 which is above the criterion to warrant it a vulnerable rating. There are no substantial threats thought to be to this species.

References

External links

bar-tailed cuckoo-dove
Birds of New Guinea
Birds of the Bismarck Archipelago
bar-tailed cuckoo-dove
Taxonomy articles created by Polbot